Han Ki-bum (born 7 June 1964) is a South Korean basketball player. He competed in the men's tournament at the 1988 Summer Olympics.

References

1964 births
Living people
South Korean men's basketball players
Olympic basketball players of South Korea
Basketball players at the 1988 Summer Olympics
Place of birth missing (living people)
Chung-Ang University alumni
Asian Games medalists in basketball
Asian Games silver medalists for South Korea
Basketball players at the 1986 Asian Games
Medalists at the 1986 Asian Games
20th-century South Korean people
21st-century South Korean people